Gareth Russell may refer to:

 Gareth Russell (musician), bass guitarist for Idlewild
 Gareth Russell (author), British author